Jeanne Bartlett (1903–1997) was an American screenwriter known for her work on early Lassie films. She worked as a writer for Metro-Goldwyn-Mayer (MGM) for fifteen years.

Career 
Bartlett played Daisy, the second victim of the werewolf, in Stuart Walker's 1935 film Werewolf of London. This was the only credited acting role of her career.

Bartlett later worked as a writer for MGM for fifteen years during the 1940s and 1950s.

Retirement 
After retiring from writing, Bartlett was an active member of the conservationist movement in Malibu. She died in of pneumonia in Santa Monica, California in January 1997. She was 94 years old.

References 

1903 births
1997 deaths
20th-century American women writers